Longjiang is a town in west-central Guangdong province, Southern China.

Bordering towns are Leliu to the east, Xingtan to the south, Lecong to the north, and Jiujiang of Nanhai District to the west.

It has direct jurisdiction over 9 residential committees and 13 rural committees, totalling 180,000.

External links
Official Government Website

Shunde District
Towns in Guangdong